Ángel Uribe Sánchez, (29 September 1943 in Ancón, Lima – 17 October 2008 in Ancón Lima) was a football forward player from Peru who played his entire club career for Universitario de Deportes. Uribe also played for the Peru national team on ten occasions between 1960 and 1967.  He was part of Peru's squad at the 1960 Summer Olympics.

Uribe died of bone cancer in October 2008.

See also
One-club man

References

External links

1943 births
2008 deaths
Footballers from Lima
Peruvian footballers
Peru international footballers
Peruvian Primera División players
Club Universitario de Deportes footballers
Footballers at the 1960 Summer Olympics
Olympic footballers of Peru
Association football forwards
Deaths from cancer in Peru
Deaths from bone cancer